Liadyxianus is an extinct genus of predaceous diving beetles in the family Dytiscidae. There is one described species in Liadyxianus, L. kirejtshuki.

References

Dytiscidae